Abacetus niger is a species of ground beetle in the subfamily Pterostichinae. It was described by Andrewes in 1942.

References

niger
Beetles described in 1942